Lennart Möller  (24 September 1954 – 19 November 2021) was a professor of environmental medicine at the Karolinska Institute in  Stockholm, Sweden.  He  received a doctorate in Medical sciences from the Karolinska Institute in 1988, with a thesis "2-nitrofluorene, in vivo metabolism and assessment of cancer risk of an air pollutant."  He was the editor and author of several books in popular sciences and theology covering urban air quality, cancer, environmental medicine, ethics, and photography. He was the deputy chairman of the board for the Lennart Nilsson Award, an international prize in scientific photography.

He was a signatory to the A Scientific Dissent From Darwinism statement issued in 2001 by the Discovery Institute, a conservative Christian think tank based in Seattle, Washington, US, best known for its advocacy of intelligent design. The statement expresses skepticism about the ability of random mutations and natural selection to account for the complexity of life, and encourages careful examination of the evidence for "Darwinism", a term intelligent design proponents use to refer to evolution. Its claims have been rejected by the scientific community.

Möller was the author of The Exodus Case, a 448-page book based on findings of Ron Wyatt published in 2002 and revised and expanded in 2008. The book expounds Möller's theory about the route of the biblical Exodus from Egypt, in particular that a mountain called Jabal al-Lawz in Saudi Arabia is the biblical Mount Sinai.  A review by Swedish archaeologist Martin Rundkvist stated that "Möller emphasizes that he is neither a theologian, a historian nor an archaeologist" and concludes with, "The Exodus Case is such an extreme example of pseudo-science that any reasonably well-informed reader will wonder if Möller is joking." A review on the Studiengemeinschaft Wort und Wissen (Word and Knowledge Study Community) website, whose members take a literal approach to the Bible, stated that it contained such "serious substantive and methodological errors" that it could not be recommended while agreeing that the Exodus took place. Peter van der Veen and Uwe Zerbst specifically criticized his identification of Jabal al-Lawz with Mount Sinai and a number of the geographical locations he thought to be part of the Exodus route.

External links

PubMed search for Lennart Möller

References

1954 births
2021 deaths
Academic staff of the Karolinska Institute
Karolinska Institute alumni
Physicians from Stockholm

Pseudoarchaeologists
Swedish medical researchers